Beatrice Ruby Mathews Sparks (January 15, 1917 – May 25, 2012) was a Mormon youth counselor, author, and serial hoaxer, known primarily for producing books purporting to be the "real diaries" of troubled teenagers. The books deal with topical issues such as drug abuse, Satanism, teenage pregnancy, and AIDS, and are presented as cautionary tales. Although Sparks presented herself as merely the discoverer and editor of the diaries, records at the U.S. Copyright Office list her as the sole author for all but two of them, indicating that the books were fabricated and fictional.

Biography
Beatrice Ruby Mathews Sparks was born in Goldburg, Custer County, Idaho and grew up in Logan, Utah. She was a member of The Church of Jesus Christ of Latter-day Saints and an aspiring writer who contributed to local business and church publications. In later years she claimed to be a licensed psychotherapist and youth counselor with a Ph.D. in either psychology or psychiatry. Critics have questioned Sparks's qualifications and experience, and researchers have been unable to find a record of the Ph.D. she claimed on book jackets and in her resume. One interviewer wrote that Sparks was "vague about specifics" when asked about her counseling qualifications and professional experience.

Sparks claimed that her experiences working with troubled adolescents made her want to produce cautionary tales that would keep other teens from falling into the same traps. Her first book, Go Ask Alice, was published under the byline "Anonymous" in 1971 and became a bestseller with several million copies sold. The book was presented as the diary of an unnamed teenage girl who became involved in drugs and underage sex, vowed to clean up, but then died from an overdose a few weeks after her final diary entry.

When Go Ask Alice became a hit, Sparks received substantial royalties, but as an aspiring author she was frustrated that her name was not on the book. In interviews conducted over the next few years, Sparks identified herself as the book's editor and claimed that it consisted partly of the actual diary of a troubled teen, and partly of embellished events based on Sparks's experiences working with other teens. Sparks was unable to produce the original diary for critics, and investigator Alleen Pace Nelson publicly questioned the book's veracity and verifiability. Later editions of the book contained the standard disclaimer: "This book is a work of fiction. Any references to historical events, real people, or real locales are used fictitiously. Other names, places, characters, and incidents are the product of the author's imagination, and any resemblance to actual events or locales or persons, living or dead, is entirely coincidental."

In 1973, while Go Ask Alice was still enjoying widespread success, Marcella Barrett of Pleasant Grove, Utah approached Sparks about editing the journal of Barrett's deceased son Alden. Alden had suffered from depression and committed suicide at age 16 in 1971, and his mother felt that his story might help other at-risk teens. The result was Jay's Journal in 1978, which presents the purported diary of a teenage boy named Jay who was drawn into Satanism and then took his own life for ritualistic purposes. Barrett's family was horrified by the book, and despite the changed name, residents of Pleasant Grove quickly concluded that "Jay" was in fact Alden Barrett. Barrett's family insisted that he had never been involved with Satanism or the occult, and that Sparks had used only 21 entries from his true journal while the book contained 212 passages purporting to be from that same journal. Barrett's family also contended that Sparks fabricated stories of Satanic rituals for the book; Sparks responded that she got the extra material from letters and interviews with Alden's friends. Later investigators suggested that Sparks added claims of Satanism so Jay's Journal could receive a promotional boost from then-current social concerns about that topic; conversely, the book directly influenced the Satanic Panic of the 1980s.

After Jay's Journal, Sparks produced several more "real diaries", including It Happened to Nancy: By an Anonymous Teenager (dealing with AIDS), Almost Lost: The True Story of an Anonymous Teenager's Life on the Streets (gang violence), Annie's Baby: The Diary of Anonymous, A Pregnant Teenager, Treacherous Love: The Diary of an Anonymous Teenager (pupil seduced by teacher), Kim: Empty Inside: The Diary of an Anonymous Teenager (eating disorders), and Finding Katie: The Diary of Anonymous, A Teenager in Foster Care.

In the 2022 book Unmask Alice: LSD, Satanic Panic, and the Imposter Behind the World's Most Notorious Diaries, investigator Rick Emerson presented evidence that most of Sparks's works were hoaxes, made up of fabricated prose that Sparks claimed to be copies of real diaries from teenagers who never actually existed; and in the case of Jay's Journal, significantly altered and padded prose from Alden Barrett's true diary.

Bibliography

Diaries

All these books were published with the byline "Anonymous". Some of them credit Sparks as editor; others (such as Go Ask Alice) do not mention her at all. Almost Lost and Kim – Empty Inside are the only books for which Sparks does not claim copyright as author of the entire work. For both these books, Sparks lays claim only to the editing, compilation, and some (unspecified) additional material. The U.S. Copyright Office record for Kim – Empty Inside adds the note that some material is taken from a preexisting diary.
 Go Ask Alice (1971)
 Jay's Journal (1979)
 It Happened to Nancy: By an Anonymous Teenager (1994)
 Almost Lost: The True Story of an Anonymous Teenager's Life on the Streets (1996)
 Annie's Baby: The Diary of Anonymous, a Pregnant Teenager (1998)
 Treacherous Love: The Diary of an Anonymous Teenager (2000)
 Kim – Empty Inside: The Diary of an Anonymous Teenager (2002)
 Finding Katie: The Diary of Anonymous, A Teenager in Foster Care (2005)
 Lucy in the Sky ("in the tradition of Go Ask Alice", 2012)

Other works

 Voices: The Stories of Four Troubled Teenagers as Told in Personal Interviews to Beatrice Sparks (1978)
 The Kalamity Kids (scripts) (1991)

References

External links
 U.S. Copyright Office catalog search (tick 'combined search' and enter 'Sparks, Beatrice')

1917 births
2012 deaths
20th-century hoaxes
American Latter Day Saints
American women writers
Brigham Young University alumni
Brigham Young University faculty
Hoaxes in the United States
Literary forgeries
Music therapists
People from Custer County, Idaho
University of California, Los Angeles alumni
Writers from Idaho
People from Logan, Utah